Éric Gauthier may refer to:

 Éric Gauthier (writer) (born 1975), Quebecois author
 Eric Gauthier (dancer) (born 1977), Canadian-born dancer, choreographer and musician